Canarobius is a genus of beetles in the family Carabidae, containing the following species:

 Canarobius chusyae Machado, 1987
 Canarobius oromii Machado, 1987

References

Trechinae